The 2013–14 Campeonato Nacional season was the 83rd season of top-flight football in Chile. Unión Española was the defending champion.

Format changes
For the 2013–14 season, the ANFP's Council of Club Presidents approved the return to the Apertura and Clausura format, without playoffs.

Teams
Eighteen teams will be competing in the Primera División for the 2013–14 season, sixteen of whom are returning from the 2013 season. San Marcos de Arica was relegated last season after finishing 18th. There were replaced by Universidad de Concepción, the 2013 Primera B winner.

Torneo Apertura
The Torneo Apertura began on July 26 and ended on December 8.

Standings

Results

Súper Final

Apertura Liguilla
Winner qualify for 2014 Copa Libertadores first stage (Chile 3).
Runner-up qualify for 2014 Copa Sudamericana first stage (Chile 4).

Torneo Clausura
The Torneo Clausura began on January 3 and ended on April 27.

Standings

Results

Clausura Liguilla
Winner qualify for 2014 Copa Sudamericana first stage (Chile 2).

Aggregate table

References

External links
ANFP 
2013 Chilean Primera División season at Soccerway
Season regulations 

 
1
Primera División de Chile seasons
Chile
Chile